William Stirling-Hamilton may refer to:

Sir William Hamilton, 9th Baronet (1788–1856)
Sir William Stirling-Hamilton, 10th Baronet (1830–1913) of the Stirling-Hamilton Baronets
Sir William Stirling-Hamilton, 11th Baronet (1868–1946) of the Stirling-Hamilton Baronets

See also
Stirling-Hamilton Baronets
William Stirling (disambiguation)
William Hamilton (disambiguation)